is a fighting game developed and published by Bandai and released exclusively in Japan for the WonderSwan Color handheld console. It is an expansion to Digimon Tamers: Battle Spirit (released in the United States and Europe as Digimon Battle Spirit) and contains many new features and characters. Unlike its predecessor or sequel, Digimon Battle Spirit 2, this game did not receive a Game Boy Advance port.

Changes 
Digimon Tamers: Battle Spirit Ver. 1.5 contained everything its previous version contained, along with some added characters, an extended "storyline", and several other bonuses.

Opening
Digimon Tamers: Battle Spirit Ver. 1.5 had a similar opening to the original game, although lengthened to contain the expanded roster (although BlackAgumon and Extra Agumon were not revealed. A shadowed Beelzemon Blast Mode is shown along with Impmon and Milleniummon

The final scene of the opening is randomly picked. The following duels could be seen at the end:

BlackWarGreymon vs. WarGreymon

MegaGargomon vs. Cherubimon

Gallantmon vs. Omnimon

Seraphimon vs. Ophanimon

Gallantmon Crimson Mode vs. Beelzemon Blast Mode

Story Line
By beating the game on Normal difficulty or higher without losing, the player got a chance to battle ZeedMillenniummon as a second "final boss".

Updated Character Roster
All of the original characters, including the unlockable Digimon, from Digimon Tamers: Battle Spirit were included as playable characters from the start, with the exception of Impmon. In addition, Patamon and Gatomon were added, with Seraphimon and Ophanimon as their Digivolutions, respectively.

In addition, there were two unlockable Digimon; An Extra Guilmon (who is unlocked by obtaining the "ultimate*" level tag in single player mode) who, like the Extra Agumon that could Digivolve into Omnimon, Digivolved into Gallantmon Crimson Mode, and the returning Impmon (who is unlocked by obtaining the "champion*" level tag in single player mode), with Beelzemon Blast Mode as a new Digivolution .

Added Levels
Three new levels were added in Digimon Tamers: Battle Spirit Ver. 1.5.

A Locomon level, was included as Patamon's level. The Train had two vents on either side of the level which worked similar to the trampoline in Terriermon's level. During the match, the train passes through a modern, unnamed town. DemiDevimon are constantly flying above the fighters.

A waterfall level was included as Gatomon's level. The Digimon fight beside and behind the waterfall, with bushes here and there on the sides. Makuramon can occasionally be seen in the bushes, and Gotsumon occasionally roll down the mountain. This is the only vertical level in the Digimon: Battle Spirit series.

Instead of randomly interrupting a fight, Impmon received his own stage, which appears to be loosely based on the net from the Second Digimon Movie. Television screens of Impmon line both sides of the level, and the entire stage has an odd feel to it. The level is vertically symmetrical; you can see a floor above you when you're on the highest platform. The suction effect, which draws loose data to Impmon, is automatically on.

Reception
IGN writers Lucas M. Thomas and Craig Harrist listed 1.5 as one of the games they would most like to see appear on the DSiWare service for the Nintendo DSi. They claimed that "it would still be interesting to get this game on our DSi systems through digital download -- to play for fun, but also because of its place in industry history", referring to its status as one of the final games for the WonderSwan Color.

References

External links 

2002 video games
Tamers:_Battle_Spirit_Ver._1.5
Dimps games
Fighting games
Japan-exclusive video games
Multiplayer and single-player video games
Platform fighters
Video games developed in Japan
WonderSwan Color games